Lacarne is an unincorporated community in southwestern Erie Township, Ottawa County, Ohio, United States. It has a post office with the ZIP code 43439.

The community most likely bears the French surname of a pioneer settler.

References

Unincorporated communities in Ottawa County, Ohio
Unincorporated communities in Ohio